The 2019 DTM was the thirty-third season of premier German touring car championship, first season under "Class 1" regulations era and also twentieth season under the moniker of DTM since the series' resumption in 2000. Mercedes-AMG withdrew from the championship after the 2018 season to focus on their Formula E entry. British sports car manufacturer Aston Martin replaced Mercedes-Benz, which marked the first non-German entry in 23 years when Italian car manufacturer Alfa Romeo last entered the series under the International Touring Car Series name in 1996. Defending champion Gary Paffett did not return to defend his title, as he moved to Formula E.

The 2019 season oversaw the championship introduce revolutionary regulations known as "Class 1", the biggest change to the sport in recent history. These regulations will be shared between the DTM and the Japanese Super GT series' GT500 class from 2020, allowing entries to compete in both championships. The 2019 championship saw the running of the 500th DTM race, which was held as the second race at Lausitzring.

Audi clinched the manufacturers' championship title for the seventh time, with four races to spare. René Rast clinched his second DTM driver's title in the Nürburgring round.

Rule changes

Technical regulations

Engine formula
The 2019 season saw the introduction of a brand-new prototype road car-based fuel-efficient engine configuration, with turbocharged engines returned to the sport for the first time since 1989. Engine unit changes during a race weekend result in a 10-place grid penalty for the requisite driver. All engines would remain to run on Aral Ultimate 102 RON unleaded fuel. The traditional  naturally-aspirated V8 engines that were used since 2000 were permanently retired.

Aerodynamics and other components
The single-plane element rear wing returns for the first time since 2016 but would be wider. As a result, the Drag Reduction Systems (DRS) used for assisting overtaking maneuvers will be revised, with use now within three seconds of a driver in front.
Launch control was outlawed, while the traditional interior rear view mirror was replaced by a rear-view camera. Meanwhile all electronic devices were upgraded due to new Class 1 regulations including all-new Bosch DDU 10 color display dash, Bosch MS 7.4 engine management system, Bosch PBX 190 power management systems and also Tyre Pressure Management Systems (TPMS).

Sporting regulations
The two races per round format was retained, but the fixed lap distance format (last used in 2014) was initially brought back, replacing the timed race format (55 minutes plus 1 lap most recently) that had been used for the previous 4 years; there was a caveat in the case of a safety car period, the race could be extended by up to 3 laps. However after the opening round of the season, the previous timed race format was reinstated with the addition of the race-extending safety car rule.

Teams and drivers
The following manufacturers, teams and drivers competed in the 2019 DTM. All teams competed with tyres supplied by Hankook.

Team changes

 Aston Martin entered the championship, replacing Mercedes-Benz, with cars based on the Vantage. The entry is run by AF Racing AG and built by HWA.
 W Racing Team entered the championship as a customer team, fielding two Audi RS5 Turbo DTM machines. They were the first Audi Sport DTM independent customer team since Futurecom TME, that competed between 2006 and 2009.
 Super GT manufacturers Honda, Lexus and Nissan fielded one car each as wildcard entries at the Hockenheimring season finale, to mark the beginning of the shared "Class 1" regulations for DTM and Super GT GT500.

Driver changes
Augusto Farfus left the series after seven years to join BRC Hyundai N Lukoil Racing Team in the World Touring Car Cup. He continued his association with BMW in the FIA World Endurance Championship. He was replaced by 2018 ADAC GT Masters runner-up Sheldon van der Linde.
 Reigning champion Gary Paffett left the series after sixteen years to compete with HWA Racelab in Formula E. Pascal Wehrlein (Mahindra Racing) and Edoardo Mortara (Venturi) also compete in Formula E.
 Following Mercedes' exit from the series, Lucas Auer joined Super Formula with the B-MAX Racing with Motopark team.
 Ferdinand Habsburg and Jake Dennis made their DTM débuts with the R-Motorsport Aston Martin team.
 2016–17 Formula 4 UAE Championship winner Jonathan Aberdein and 2017 World Series Formula V8 3.5 champion Pietro Fittipaldi made their DTM débuts with the W Racing Team.

Mid-season changes
Ducati MotoGP rider Andrea Dovizioso was announced to be replacing Pietro Fittipaldi at Misano due to Fittipaldi having a Friday practice commitment for the Haas F1 Team at the concurrent Canadian Grand Prix. However, Fittipaldi was announced to be competing in the meeting after all – albeit for Audi Sport Team Rosberg – replacing Jamie Green, who was recovering from appendicitis.

Calendar
A nine-round calendar was announced in October 2018.

Calendar changes
 With the adoption of Class 1 regulations, the series will share two rounds with the Super GT championship. One is planned to be held in Europe and the other in Asia. A balance of performance formula will be applied to ensure parity between DTM cars and Super GT as Super GT will not adopt Class 1 regulations until 2020.
 The rounds at the Hungaroring, Red Bull Ring and Zandvoort were removed from the schedule. The series will instead make its debut at the TT Circuit Assen and return to Circuit Zolder for the first time since 2002. Meanwhile the Misano round will revert to a daytime start time instead of nighttime.
 A non-championship race will be held at Fuji as a supporting event of the Super GT x DTM Dream Race.

Results and standings

Season summary

Scoring system

Points were awarded to the top ten classified finishers as follows:

Additionally, the top three placed drivers in qualifying also received points:

Drivers' championship

† — Driver retired, but was classified as they completed 75% of the winner's race distance.

Teams' championship

Manufacturers' championship

Notes

References

External links
  

Deutsche Tourenwagen Masters seasons
Deutsche Tourenwagen Masters